Doug Coutts is a Scottish former professional football defender who played for Aberdeen, Berwick Rangers, Wigan Athletic and Altrincham.

He played for Wigan between 1969 and 1972, making 102 appearances and scoring two goals for the club in the Northern Premier League.

References

External links
AFC Heritage profile

Living people
Association football defenders
Aberdeen F.C. players
Berwick Rangers F.C. players
Wigan Athletic F.C. players
Altrincham F.C. players
Scottish Football League players
Banks O' Dee F.C. players
Year of birth missing (living people)
Scottish footballers